Herpothallon capilliferum is a species of corticolous (bark-dwelling), crustose lichen in the family Arthoniaceae. Found in China, it was formally described as a new species in 2022 by Pengfei Chen and Lulu Zhang. The main characteristics of the species are the presence of norstictic acid as a major lichen product, and the projecting hyphae of the pseudisidia. The species epithet capilliferum refers to this latter characteristic.

References

Arthoniomycetes
Lichen species
Lichens described in 2022
Lichens of China